Zari (also Romanized as Zārī) is a village in Daman Kuh Rural District, in the Central District of Esfarayen County, North Khorasan Province, Iran. At the 2006 census, its population was 285, in 61 families.
The language of the people of this village is Kurdish Kurmanji.  Kalimullah Tavahodi in his book Esfarayen yesterday and today (1996) considers the people of this village to be from the Pahlavanlu tribe and the great Zafranlu tribe.  The Pahlavanlus lived north of Quchan in the Durbadam region.  They migrated to the mountains between Shirvan and Esfarayen on the 20th of Shawwal 1318 AH and sold their summer residence to the Sevkanlu tribe in O
Oghaz and then dispersed.  Some came to the southern foothills of the Saluk Mountains and settled next to the village of Tuy and formed the village of Zari.

References 

Populated places in Esfarayen County